Pringle's puffback (Dryoscopus pringlii) is a species of bird in the family Malaconotidae.
It is found in southern Ethiopia, Kenya, Somalia, and northern Tanzania.
Its natural habitat is dry savanna.

References

Pringle's puffback
Birds of the Horn of Africa
Pringle's puffback
Taxonomy articles created by Polbot